Bad Boy 20th Anniversary Box Set Edition is a box set compilation of songs by the American record label Bad Boy Records released on August 12, 2016, and distributed by Rhino in both digital and physical formats. The collection, curated by Bad Boy's President Harve Pierre, honors the legacy of Sean "Diddy" Combs aka Puff Daddy and his record label celebrating over two decades in hip-hop and R&B.

The box set features 80 tracks across five CDs and includes remastered hits from Puff Daddy (under his various aliases), The Notorious B.I.G., Craig Mack, Faith Evans, Total, Carl Thomas, Mase, 112, The Lox, Cassie, Janelle Monáe, Danity Kane, Machine Gun Kelly, French Montana as well as other Bad Boy artists. It also comes with a 64-page historiography and foreword, written by rap journalist Michael A. Gonzales.

Combs, the Founder and Chairman of Bad Boy Entertainment, talked about the project saying: "We wanted to thank our fans, celebrate the music, the people, and the Bad Boy lifestyle that have defined the past two decades," continuing, "We've always made music that makes the people dance; this collection does all that and more, and it is a celebration of all things Bad Boy." Despite founding the label in 1993, Bad Boy began celebrating their 20th anniversary in 2015 with a 20-minute mega-medley performance at the BET Awards. It stretched into 2016, starting with the label's May reunion sold-out shows at the Barclays Center in Brooklyn, and originating the Bad Boy Family Reunion Tour, starting in North America in the last week of August 2016.

Track listing

Release history

References

2016 compilation albums
Albums produced by Sean Combs
Bad Boy Records compilation albums
Contemporary R&B compilation albums
Hip hop compilation albums
Record label compilation albums